NGC 6152 is an open cluster of stars located in the constellation Norma.

References

External links
 

6152
Open clusters
Norma (constellation)